Sudeten may refer to:

 Sudeten Mountains 
 Sudetenland
 Sudeten Germans